Fazadinium bromide is a muscle relaxant which acts as a nicotinic acetylcholine receptor antagonist through neuromuscular blockade.

References 

Bromides
Azo compounds
Imidazopyridines
Nicotinic antagonists